is a Japanese model and actress. She has been described as one of the first Asian models to walk European catwalks, but there were models like Sayoko Yamaguchi that walked the runways in 1970s and 1980s.

Career 
She has appeared on the cover of Vogue in her native country, as well as Harper's Bazaar (Japan, China, Singapore, Malaysia, Indonesia), Elle (Japan, Singapore, Hong Kong), Marie Claire (Hong Kong) and Madame Figaro (Taiwan, Thailand). Tominaga has walked in runway shows for John Galliano, Vivienne Tam, Anna Sui, Christian Dior, Karl Lagerfeld, Lanvin, Gucci, Michael Kors, Ralph Lauren, Dolce and Gabbana, Givenchy, Elie Saab, Alexander McQueen and Valentino, among others.  Tominaga has appeared in many fashion magazines including Vogue (American, French, British, Japanese, Russian and German), Harper's Bazaar and i-D, and has been shot by photographers such as Annie Leibovitz, Nick Knight, Steven Meisel, Ellen von Unwerth, Mert and Marcus and Peter Lindbergh.

Tominaga has featured in campaigns for Yves Saint Laurent (with top models Jacquetta Wheeler, Carmen Kass and Caroline Ribeiro), Gucci, Hermès, Tag Heuer, Banana Republic and Moschino.  Tominaga also appeared in the 2004 Pirelli Calendar.
Nowadays, she is based in Tokyo and continued to take on new challenges as a personality on TV, radio and various events, along with modelling.

Personal life
She married a Japanese chef in 2004, and gave birth to a son in 2005. The couple divorced in 2009. She is based in Tokyo.

Filmography

Film
From the End of the World (2023)

Television
Ōoku: The Inner Chambers (2023), Tokugawa Yoshimune

References

External links 

 
 
 
 
 
 Ai Tominaga at Adversus.asia

1982 births
Living people
People from Sagamihara
IMG Models models
Japanese female models